Max Nosseck (19 September 1902 – 29 September 1972) was a German film director, actor and screenwriter.

Biography
Nosseck was born in Nakel, then in Prussia, but now in Poland. Nosseck established himself as a director in the German Film Industry, but due to his Jewish background he was forced to emigrate following the Nazi takeover in 1933. He directed films in Spain, the Netherlands and United States. Following the Second World War he returned to work in the German and Austrian industries. Nosseck married three times: to Austrian actress Olly Gebauer, to German actress Ilse Steppat, and to the writer and aviator Genevieve Haugen.

He died in Bad Wiessee.

Selected filmography
Director
 Liebeskleeblatt (1930)
 Dance Into Happiness (1930)
 Einmal möcht' ich keine Sorgen haben (1932)
 All Is at Stake (1932)
 Wild Cattle (1934)
 Una semana de felicidad (1934)
 Le Roi des Champs-Élysées (1934)
 De Big van het Regiment (1935)
 Aventura oriental (1935)
 Oranje Hein (1936)
 Poderoso caballer (1936)
 Overture to Glory (1940)
 Girls Under 21 (1940)
 Gambling Daughters (1941)
 Dillinger (1945)
 The Brighton Strangler (1945)
 Black Beauty (1946)
 The Return of Rin Tin Tin (1947)
 Kill or Be Killed (1950)
 Korea Patrol (1951)
 The Hoodlum (1951)
 Garden of Eden (1954)
 The Captain and His Hero (1955)
 Singing in the Dark (1956)
Screenwriter
 Munchhausen in Africa (1958)
Actor
 Derby (1926)
 Liebeskleeblatt (1930)
 Dance Into Happiness (1930)
 Sperrbezirk (1966)
 How Did a Nice Girl Like You Get Into This Business? (1970)
 Gentlemen in White Vests (1970)

References

External links

1902 births
1972 deaths
People from Nakło nad Notecią
Jewish German male actors
German male film actors
German male silent film actors
20th-century German male actors
German film directors
Jewish emigrants from Nazi Germany to the United States